This list of cowboy halls of fame encompasses cowboy and western halls of fame defined for this context as institutions (including nonprofit organizations, government entities, and private businesses). Museums that exist only in cyberspace (i.e., virtual museums) are also included. To use the sortable table, click on the icons at the top of each column to sort that column in alphabetical order; click again for reverse alphabetical order.  The ND Cowboy Hall of Fame in Medora, ND opened in 2005.

Halls of fame

References

Cowboy halls of fame
Sports halls of fame
Sports hall of fame inductees
Sport-related lists
Culture of the Western United States
Rodeo in the United States